The Roubal Case is a three-part television miniseries by TV Nova, which premiered on the Voyo platform during November and December 2021. It was filmed by director Tereza Kopáčová in the production of Evolution Films. It is inspired by the real events surrounding serial killer Ivan Roubal. Hynek Čermák, Kamila Trnková, Vojtěch Vodochodský, Dagmar Havlová, Jan Čenský and David Švehlík starred in the series.

Plot
Two men die during a robbery of a car repair shop. Ivan Roubal is accused of the murder. State attorney Markéta Neumannová and criminal investigator Jakub Miller suspect him of committing six more murders. Junior defense attorney Daniela gets her first opportunity from her boss who is representing Roubal ex offo to demonstrate what she can do. She is successful, challenging the testimony of a key witness in court. Ivan Roubal is about to be released from custody and threatens to kill again. The investigators have 40 hours left to stop it. They are looking for a woman who may have been an accomplice to the murder of Václav Dlouhý who was engaged in filming and distributing porn. Daniela digs deeper into the case and comes across disturbing facts. The trial has entered its final phase, but the police still have no evidence that would stand up in court. Daniela leaves her position as a paralegal and manages to get a key piece of information.

Cast 
 Hynek Čermák as Ivan Roubal
 David Švehlík as mjr. Bc. Jakub Miller
 Dagmar Havlová as prosecutor Mgr. Markéta Neumannová
 Kamila Trnková as junior attorney Bc. Daniela Stolařová
 Jan Čenský as JUDr. Hynek Pokorný, defense attorney
 Vojtěch Vodochodský as Bc. Roman Kraus, prosecutor's assistant
 Jiří Roskot as npor. Martin Pražák, policeman
 Aleš Petráš as por. Petr Anděl, policeman
 Zdeněk Julina as kpt. Ivo Kramář, policeman
 Helena Dvořáková as Hana Marková, Roubal's girlfriend
 Jan Komínek as Tomáš Kovář
 Štěpán Tuček as Petr Mráz
 Cyril Dobrý as Michal Olah
 Jan Šaněk as Václav Dlouhý
 Petr Franěk as František Heppner
 Verica Nedeska as Nataša, Heppner's girlfriend
 Regina Rázlová as Holešová
 Jitka Sedláčková as Manuela
 Vojtěch Hrabák as Viktor Roubal, Roubal's son
 Jan Slovák as judge JUDr. Zapletal
 Jan Antonín Duchoslav as judge JUDr. Dvorský
 Jan Holík as judge JUDr. Antonín Janata
 Martin Siničak as judge JUDr. Dušan Jílek
 Matěj Šumbera as Marek Hybš
 Daniel Krečmar as Oleg Azarov
 Michal Dalecký as junior attorney
 Jacob Erftemeijer as policeman in prison
 Vlasta Žehrová as secretary

Production
It is the first miniseries filmed under the brand Voyo Original. Jan Štoček, a former policeman from the Prague murder party was behind the capture of many of criminals including Ivan Roubal served as an expert advisor. Stoček became the prototype for the character played by David Švehlík in the miniseries.

Episodes

References

External links 
Official site
IMDB site

Czech crime television series
Czech legal television series
2021 Czech television series debuts
TV Nova (Czech TV channel) original programming
Television series about serial killers
Czech television miniseries